The Rusakov Workers' Club in Moscow is a notable example of constructivist architecture. Designed by Konstantin Melnikov, it was constructed in 1927–28. The club is built on a fan-shaped plan, with three cantilevered concrete seating areas rising above the base. Each of these volumes can be used as a separate auditorium, and combined they result in a capacity of over 1,000 people.  At the rear of the building are more conventional offices. The only visible materials used in its construction are concrete, brick and glass. The function of the building is to some extent expressed in the exterior, which Melnikov described as a "tensed muscle".

Preservation

The building was included in the 1998 World Monuments Watch by the World Monuments Fund to call attention to its very poor condition. According to the Fund the roof and foundations had weakened, the columns were in need of reinforcement, and brick walls were cracking.

The site was listed again in the 2000 World Monuments Watch. With a grant from American Express, World Monuments Fund provided a much-needed replacement roof for the building. The project was overseen by the Moscow Committee for Monuments Protection, which provided additional funds.

In 2005 a commemorative coin (3 ruble, silver) was issued by the Central Bank of Russia, featuring the Rusakov Workers' Club building.

References

Buildings and structures in Moscow
Constructivist architecture
Russian avant-garde
Buildings and structures built in the Soviet Union
Buildings and structures completed in 1928
Modernist architecture in Russia
Cultural heritage monuments of regional significance in Moscow